Steve Holden may refer to:

carer for gavin on away days 

 Steve Holden (American football) (born 1951), American football player
 Steve Holden (speedway rider) (1952–2014), British speedway rider
 Stephen Holden (born 1941), American writer and critic
 S. D. Holden (Stephen Dewar Holden, 1870–1918), British engineer
 Steve Holden (One Life to Live), a fictional character from the American soap opera One Life to Live